The 2018 Challenge Trophy (part of the Toyota National Championships for sponsorship reasons) is the national championship for men's soccer clubs competing at the amateur level in the Canadian soccer pyramid. It was held in Saskatoon, Saskatchewan from October 4–8, 2018.

Teams 
Ten teams were granted entry into the competition; one from each Canadian province. Teams are selected by their provincial soccer associations; most often qualifying by winning provincial leagues or cup championships such as the Ontario Cup.

Group stage
The ten teams in the competition are divided into two groups of five teams each, which then play a single-game round-robin format.  At the end of the group stage, each team faces the equal-ranked team from the other group to determine a final seeding for the tournament.

Final round
The final round consists of one game for each club, where they are paired with their equal-ranked opponent from the opposite group to determine a final ranking for the tournament.

References

External links 
 Canadian Soccer Association National Championships

Challenge Trophy
Canadian National Challenge Cup